Bath Community Schools is a school district headquartered in Bath Charter Township, Michigan.

History

In 2016 the district gave refunds out to entities that gave it money for bonds. The refunds meant that the school district got back $1,000,000 that was in interest.

In 2019 Paul Hartsig became the superintendent.

Attendance area
Most of the district is in Clinton County. It includes the Bath census-designated place and portions of East Lansing. Most of Bath Charter Township is in the district, as are parts of DeWitt Charter Township and Victor Township. A small portion extends into Woodhull Township, Shiawassee County.

Schools
 Bath Community High School
 Bath Community Middle School
 Bath Community Elementary School

See also
 Bath School disaster

References

External links
 Bath Community Schools

School districts in Michigan
Education in Clinton County, Michigan
Education in Shiawassee County, Michigan
1922 establishments in Michigan